Richard Raymond Gee (July 16, 1894 – January 3, 1968) was an American baseball catcher in the Negro leagues.

Biography
Gee was born in Cleburne, Texas. He played for the minor league Abilene Eagles of the West Texas League from 1920-1922. He played for the Lincoln Giants from 1923 to 1926.

Family life
Gee's brother, Tom Gee, also played in the Negro leagues, and was Rich's teammate with the Giants in 1925 and 1926.

Notes

External links
 and Seamheads

1894 births
1968 deaths
Lincoln Giants players
Baseball players from Texas
People from Cleburne, Texas
20th-century African-American sportspeople
Baseball catchers